MKTO is an American pop and hip hop duo, consisting of Malcolm Kelley and Tony Oller. Their self-titled album was released on January 30, 2014, by Columbia Records. In July 2015, the duo released their first extended play, titled Bad Girls EP. As of 2022, the band has sold over 1 million records worldwide.

Career

2010–2012: Formation
Malcolm Kelley and Tony Oller met in 2010 while filming the Nickelodeon television series Gigantic, in which their characters played best friends. They later formed as a duo  and came up with the name MKTO, which represents the combined initials of their names and surnames, MK for Malcolm Kelley and TO for Tony Oller. They elaborated upon the inspiration for their name, saying: "It also stands for what our album kind of is: Misfit Kids and Total Outcasts – just like the kids we were in high school".

2012–2014: MKTO
The duo signed to Columbia Records and released their debut single "Thank You" on November 12, 2012. The song's genre is a crossover between pop and hip hop. The song has attained commercial success, reaching the top ten on both the Australian and New Zealand singles charts. The song's music video was released on YouTube via Vevo on January 4, 2013, and garnered over 500,000 views within two days of being released. It now sits at over 25 million views. In the music video, Harold Perrineau, who played the father of Kelley's character on Lost, appeared as a reference to the show. MKTO released their second single, "Classic" along with the music video on June 20, 2013. Classic peaked at number 14 on the US Billboard Hot 100, and the music video has since compiled over 200 million views on YouTube. The music video for their third single, "God Only Knows", was released on November 29, 2013, on YouTube and Vevo. God Only Knows peaked at number 11 in Australia and at number 19 in New Zealand. In 2013, they served as the opening for Emblem3 on their summer tour across the United States. They also served as the opening for Emblem3's #bandlife Tour and Demi Lovato's "Demi: World Tour" in 2014. Their self-titled debut album was released on January 30, 2014 in Australia and New Zealand and it was released on April 1 in North America.

In February 2014, their debut album went to #1 in Australia and #6 in New Zealand. During the summer of 2014, MKTO went on their first headlining tour, the American Dream Tour. This featured opening acts Tiffany Houghton and Action Item. The fourth single from their debut album in the United States is "American Dream" and peaked at number 40 in Australia and at number 12 in New Zealand. Despite not being singles, "Forever Until Tomorrow" reached number 23 on iTunes in Australia and "Heartbreak Holiday" reached number 30 on iTunes in Australia and number 42 in the United States.

2015–2016: Bad Girls EP
On July 22, 2015, MKTO released their first extended play Bad Girls EP, which was preceded by the June 2015 release of its lead single "Bad Girls". The single peaked at number 80 in Australia and peaked at number 36 on the Billboard Mainstream Top 40. The EP peaked at number 32 on the iTunes chart in Australia and number 50 on the iTunes chart in the United States. A double A-side single including two brand-new tracks "Hands Off My Heart/Places You Go" was premiered exclusively on Billboard on March 9, 2016. "Superstitious" is the second single that was released in 2016 by the duo.

2017–present: Canceled second studio album, disbandment, return
On March 10, 2017, Oller announced on Twitter that the band had broken up. However, according to their Twitter page, they plan to release new music very soon.
On June 12, 2018, MKTO announced on Twitter that they were back together. Three days later, on June 15, the band announced they had signed a new record deal with BMG. Following the announcement, the duo released a new single titled, "How Can I Forget" in September 2018. In June 2019, they released another single, "Shoulda Known Better". A third single, "Marry Those Eyes" was released on  September 6, 2019. "Consider Me Yours" was released on  November 22, 2019. In April 2020, MKTO released a music video for Just Imagine It. They also released 3 singles, "Simple Things", "Party With My Friends" and "How Much". "Party With My Friends" peaked at number 85 on iTunes while "How Much" peaked at number 54 on iTunes. On August 17, 2021, Tony Oller announced via social media that he would be moving on from the band. However, months after this announcement, it appears he has returned as he frequently uploads on the MKTO YouTube channel and is set to perform a live show in May 2022.

Discography

Albums

EPs

Singles

As lead artist

Promotional singles

As featured artist

Awards and nominations

Teen Choice Awards

Radio Disney Music Awards

Notes

References

American boy bands
Pop music duos
Musical groups established in 2010
Pop-rap groups
Teen pop groups
Columbia Records artists
Male musical duos
2010 establishments in California